The Eastman Monument is a public artwork by an unknown artist, located at Crown Hill National Cemetery, which is in Indianapolis, Indiana, United States of America. It is a monument with a white marble angel standing against a granite cross that is standing upon three steps. The angel is dressed in a cloth gown and stands with its hands spread out and its head turned down to the ground. The first step has "EASTMAN" written across it.

Information

This monument was installed by the Eastman family in the early 20th century. Members of the Eastman family are buried in front of the monument. The family operated a medical clinic called the Eastman Clinic in the early 20th century, which is displayed on the headstones of the family members who worked in the medical field.

Further reading
Greiff, Glory-June. Remembrance, Faith, and Fancy: Outdoor Public Sculpture in Indiana. Indianapolis: Indiana Historical Society Press (2005). 
Roark, Elisabeth L. “Transmigration/Transformation: Enrico Butti's Angel in Milan and Pittsburgh.” The Italian American Review, vol. 7, no. 2, 2017, pp. 148–179. JSTOR, http://www.jstor.org/stable/10.5406/italamerrevi.7.2.0148.
Wissing, Douglas. Crown Hill: History, Spirit, and Sanctuary. Indianapolis: Indiana Historical Society Press (2013).

References

External links
Eastman Monument on Flickr.

Outdoor sculptures in Indianapolis
Cemetery art
Burial monuments and structures
Angels in art
Cross symbols
Marble sculptures in Indiana
1900s sculptures
1900s establishments in Indiana